Yadua Taba (pronounced ) is a volcanic islet in Fiji, an outlier to the northern island of Vanua Levu, and immediately south of the larger island Yadua.  Yadua Taba covers an area of 0.7 square kilometres and has a maximum elevation of 100 meters. Yadua Taba is a protected sanctuary for the Fiji Crested Iguana, Brachylophus vitiensis, and also contains a strand of dry littoral forestry, almost completely lost in the rest of Fiji.  Landing here is strictly prohibited.

In 1979, the Fiji government protected the island when the iguana population was discovered. The sanctuary is of national significance as outlined in Fiji's Biodiversity Strategy and Action Plan.

World Heritage Status 
This site was added to the UNESCO World Heritage Tentative List on October 26, 1999, in the Natural category.

See also 

 Desert island
 List of islands

References 

Uninhabited islands of Fiji
Vanua Levu
Preliminary Register of Sites of National Significance in Fiji
World Heritage Tentative List
Protected areas established in 1981